A referendum on the archive law was held in Slovenia on 8 June 2014. Voters were asked whether they were in favor of the amendments to the law that were passed in January 2014. The amendments were rejected by 67% of voters, although the referendum was invalidated by "no" voters accounting for only 7.79% of all registered voters, well below the 20% quorum.

Background
The referendum was initiated by Eva Irgl, an MP for the Slovenian Democratic Party (SDS), following a decision by the National Assembly on 28 January 2014 to amend the law on the national archives. The amendment would result in the anonymisation of personal data of people working for and victims of the Yugoslav-era secret services. The party collected over 40,000 signatures, enough to force a referendum.

The referendum was originally set to be held on 4 May following a decree in the National Assembly. However, the SDS appealed to the Supreme Court, claiming that the date was inappropriate, as early voting would coincide with the May Day public holiday. The appeal was unanimously upheld by the Court, who ordered the National Assembly to set a new date within seven days. The Court also ruled against the National Assembly claim that the referendum could not be held in parallel with the European Parliament elections on 25 May. This date had been favoured by the referendum's initiators, as a constitutional amendment in 2012 had introduced new quorum requirement requiring a minimum turnout for a law to be rejected. The Constitution states that a law is rejected in a referendum if a majority of voters who have cast valid votes vote against the law, provided at least one fifth of all qualified voters have voted against.

On 24 April the National Assembly approved holding the referendum on 8 June. The SDS claimed it would challenge the new date in the Supreme Court.

Results

Although a majority of voters who cast valid votes voted against the law, the second constitutional requirement that at least one fifth of all qualified voters have voted against the law was not met.

References

2014 in Slovenia
2014
2014 referendums
June 2014 events in Europe